also translated without the redundancy as Heisei-ōzeki (Heisei Great Weir or Barrage) is a mobile barrage dam on the Yamakuni River between Kōge, Fukuoka Prefecture and Nakatsu, Ōita Prefecture in Japan. It was constructed in phases for flood control and water supply purposes and fully completed in 1991.

References

Dams in Fukuoka Prefecture
Dams completed in 1991
Dams in Ōita Prefecture